Rebellion (Spanish:Rebeldía, German:Duell der Herzen) is a 1954 Spanish-German drama film directed by José Antonio Nieves Conde and starring Delia Garcés, Fernando Fernán Gómez and Volker von Collande.

Plot 
An author of novels has no scruples and starts to break the resistance of a young girl with solid moral convictions who is in love with him.

Cast
 Delia Garcés as Margarita  
 Fernando Fernán Gómez as Federico Lanuza  
 Volker von Collande as Carlos Maraga  
 Dina Sten as Germaine 
 Fernando Rey as Capellán  
 Rafael Arcos as Miguel  
 Félix Dafauce as Doctor Sánchez  
 José Prada as  Médico de provincia  
 Francisco Bernal as Pedro 
 Társila Criado as Marcela  
 Inés Pérez Indarte as Pescadora  
 Arsenio Freignac 
 Henri Bartx 
 Fernando Heiko Vassel 
 Juan Stenzel 
 José María Rodríguez 
 María Luisa as Niña  
 José Antonio as Niño

References

Bibliography 
 Monserrat Claveras Pérez. La Pasión de Cristo en el cine. Encuentro, 2011.

External links 
 

1954 drama films
Spanish drama films
German drama films
1954 films
West German films
1950s Spanish-language films
Films directed by José Antonio Nieves Conde
German films based on plays
Films scored by Juan Quintero Muñoz
Spanish black-and-white films
German black-and-white films
1950s Spanish films
1950s German films